Michael Boxwell (born 1 February 1970) is an eco-technology author who has written the books Owning an Electric Car, Solar Electricity Handbook and Proof of Delivery Buyer's Guide, all published by Greenstream Publishing.

He frequently appears on television and on radio talking about electric cars and co-hosted both the Transport Evolved show and TEN with Nikki Gordon-Bloomfield. Both shows are produced by Little Collie Ltd.

Michael Boxwell lives in Warwickshire, England. He is married with two children.

References

1970 births
Living people
People associated with solar power
People associated with renewable energy